JBND is a pure Java library made to ease the creation of programs that present data stored in persistent sources to end users. It was created at first to streamline making Java Client applications for the WebObjects platform (by Apple Inc.), for which the GUI is written in Swing. However, JBND's architecture allows the expansion of the library to include other UI systems, as well as other persistence stores. Currently, JBND comes with full support for connecting Enterprise Objects Frameworks (the data layer of WebObjects) and Swing user interfaces.

See also

Java
GUI
Swing
WebObjects

External links
JBND homepage
The Java platform homepage
Apple WebObjects developer page

Web frameworks
Java enterprise platform
Apple Inc. software